The New Federal Theatre is a theatre company named after the African-American branch of the Federal Theatre Project, which was created in the United States during the Great Depression to provide resources for theatre and other artistic programs. The company has operated out of a few different locations on Henry Street in the Lower East Side of Manhattan. Since 1970 The New Federal Theatre has provided its community with a stage and collection of talented performers to express the voices of numerous African-America playwrights.  New Federal Theatre boasts nationally known playwrights such as Ron Milner (Checkmates), Ed Bullins (The Taking of Miss Janine), and Ntozake Shange (For Colored Girls Who Have Considered Suicide/When the Rainbow is Enuf) as well as actors including Jackée Harry, Morgan Freeman, Denzel Washington, Debbie Allen, Phylicia Rashad, Dick Anthony Williams, Glynn Turman, Taurean Blacque, Samuel L. Jackson, and Laurence Fishburne.

History 
Through a Mobilization for Youth theatre program, The New Federal Theatre was founded in 1970 by Woodie King Jr. in the multi-ethnic area of lower east side of Manhattan. The company received its original funding from a small grant by the New York State Council of Arts and by the Henry Street Settlement. While the first season was conducted in the St. Augustine Church basement, construction of the Louis Abrons Arts Center was completed in 1974 through the Henry Street Settlement. The administrative offices of New Federal Theatre moved back to St. Augustine's Church in 1996 while the company continues to work out of the Louis Abrons Art Center where it holds productions and training programs. Today, the New Federal Theatre maintains acting and playwriting workshops for their students at the Dewey Cultural Center located on St. Nicholas Avenue in New York City. The Department of Cultural Affairs recently cut its $15,000 funding to the New Heritage Theatre Group, the New Federal Theatre, and the Negro Ensemble Company, which the companies intend to appeal.

Important individuals 
 Woodie King Jr. - Founder - Producer - Director 
 Laurie Carlos - Director
 Shauneille Perry - Director 
 Pat White - Company Manager 
 Paula Moss - Choreographer 
 Judy Dearing - Costume Design
 Judy Kadiatou - Costume Design
 Ed Montgomery - Musical Arrangement and Direction
 Richard C. Mills - Set designer
 Bernard Gersten - Producer
 Joseph Papp - Producer

Mission statement 
The New Federal Theatre brings the enjoyment of live stage to minorities in the Lower East Side as well as in the greater Metropolitan surroundings. The companies existence has brought numerous up-and-coming actors, designers, directors and playwrights to national attention in their fields.

"New Federal Theatre's mission is to integrate minorities and women into the mainstream of American theatre by training artists for the profession, and by presenting plays by minorities and women to integrated, multicultural audiences-plays which evoke the truth through beautiful and artistic re-creations of ourselves."

Playwrights 
The playwrights listed below developed their voices in African-American theatre through the Federal Theatre Company. Notable playwrights are Ntozake Shange, Ronald Milner, and Richard Abrons.
 Richard Abrons - The Brothers Berg (2000), Whose Family Values! (2003), Every Day a Visitor (2001)
 Trazana Beverley - The Spirit Moves (1994)
 Jay Broad - Conflict of Interest (2000)
 Ed Bullins - The Taking of Miss Janine (1975)
 China Clark - Bessie Speaks (1994)
 Clare Coss - Our Place in Time (2000)
 Ruby Dee - My One Good Nerve (1998)
 Donald Thomas Evans - It's Showdown Time (1976)
 Rudolph Fisher - The Conjure Man Dies: A Mystery Tale of Dark Harlem (1932) (2001)
 Jennie Elizabeth Franklin - Black Girl (1971) (1995)
 P.J. Gibson - Long Time Since Yesterday (1985)
 Don Wilson Glen - American Menu (2003)
 Lee Gundersheimer - Incommunicado  (1997)
 Nikos Kazantzakis - Christopher Columbus (1998)
 Oliver Lake - The Matador of 1st and 1st (1995)
 Marcia L. Leslie - The Trial of One Short-Sighted Black Woman Vs. Mammy Louise and Safreeta Mae (1999)
 Robbie McCauley - My Father and the Wars (1986)
 Ronald Milner - Urban Transitions (2002), Defending the Light (2000), Checkmates (1988), (1996)
 Ntozake Shange - For Colored Girls Who Have Considered Suicide/When the Rainbow is Enuf (1976), (1995)
 Howard Simon - James Baldwin (2000)
 Clarice Taylor - Spermegga (2000)
 Samm-Art Williams - The Dance on Widows' Row (2000)

Productions 
The list of playwrights above developed their voice with the assistance from the New Federal Theatre, yet not all plays written by these individuals were performed by the company. The productions listed below were performed by the company at a few different locations in New York City.
 Production of Black Girl  by Jennie Elizabeth in 1971
 Production of The Taking of Miss Janie by Ed Bullins in 1975
 Production of For Colored Girls Who Have Considered Suicide/When the Rainbow is Enuf by Ntozake Shange in 1976
 Production of It's Showtime by Donald Thomas Evans in 1976
 Production of Long Time Since Yesterday by P.J. Gibson in 1985 
 Production of James Baldwin: Soul On FIre by Howard Simon in 2000

Critical reception 
In the New York Times, David Dewitt described a 2000 production of James Baldwin: A Soul on Fire in the Abrons Art Center that the as "...a technically modest production; a silk bedspread and scarf-covered lamp are the most telling set pieces". Despite minimal set production, Dewitt found the biographical play of Baldwin was acted out "...with humor, style and raw emotion, it embraces its chosen territory with enthusiasm."

On February 16, 1997, Lawrence Van Gelder saw a production of Do Lord Remember Me at the Kaye Playhouse between Lexington and Park Avenue. Noting all of the cast as "veterans of previous productions of [the play]", Gelder found of their performance: "Oral history may not be malleable into shapely and convenient drama, but it rings with unshakable truth".

References

External links
 New Federal Theatre records Schomburg Center for Research in Black Culture, Manuscripts, Archives and Rare Books Division, The New York Public Library.
 New Federal Theatre photographs, 1959-2014, held by the Billy Rose Theatre Division, New York Public Library for the Performing Arts

African-American theatre companies
Theatres in New York City
Theatre companies in New York City